Tonye Frank Jekiri (born 23 July 1994) is a Nigerian professional basketball player for Fenerbahçe Beko of the Turkish Basketball Super League (BSL) and the EuroLeague.

College career
Jekiri played four seasons for the Miami Hurricanes and participated in two Sweet 16s. As a senior, he averaged 7.6 points and 8.6 rebounds per game.

Professional career
Jekiri signed his first professional contract with Turkish team Bandırma Kırmızı. In the 2017–18 season, Jekiri played with BC Oostende in the Belgian Pro Basketball League. With Oostende he won the championship, and was named the PBL Finals MVP. He was also the leading rebounder in the PBL, with 7.3 per game.

On 3 July 2019 Jekiri signed a one-year contract with LDLC ASVEL of the French LNB Pro A and the EuroLeague. He averaged 8.7 points and 7.5 rebounds per game in 27 games. On 11 July 2020 Jekiri officially signed a two-year contract with Baskonia of the Liga ACB. He averaged 6.5 points and 4.8 rebounds per game. 

On July 25, 2021, Jekiri signed with the Russian team UNICS Kazan of the VTB United League and the EuroLeague (until the club was suspended from competing due to the 2022 Russian invasion of Ukraine).

On June 27, 2022, Jekiri officially signed a two-year (1+1) contract with Turkish club Fenerbahçe.

Career statistics

EuroLeague

|-
| style="text-align:left;"| 2019–20
| style="text-align:left;"| ASVEL Basket
| 27 || 23 || 23.5 || .524 || .0 || .662 || 7.5 || 1.3 || .8 || .3 || 8.7 || 12.8
|-
| style="text-align:left;"| 2020–21
| style="text-align:left;"| Baskonia
| 30 || 14 || 18.5 || .510 || .0 || .643 || 4.9 || 1.9 || .7 || .4 || 6.0 || 8.4

References

External links 
Miami Hurricanes bio

1994 births
Living people
Bandırma Kırmızı B.K. players
ASVEL Basket players
BC Oostende players
BC UNICS players
Centers (basketball)
Fenerbahçe men's basketball players
Gaziantep Basketbol players
Liga ACB players
Miami Hurricanes men's basketball players
Nigerian expatriate basketball people in France
Nigerian expatriate basketball people in Spain
Nigerian expatriate basketball people in Turkey
Nigerian expatriate basketball people in the United States
Nigerian men's basketball players
Saski Baskonia players
Sportspeople from Lagos